Brian "Dolphin" Taylor (born 10 November 1958) is a British former drummer.

Tom Robinson Band
Taylor's first band was Dragon's Playground, which earlier had had Annie Lennox as a vocalist. In 1976 Dragon's Playground appeared on ATV's New Faces.

His career with the Tom Robinson Band started when Taylor gave a friend a lift to an audition as bass guitarist for the Tom Robinson Band in 1976. As the band had no drummer at that point, Taylor (who was already a drummer) filled in. By the end of the evening, the band was still looking for a bass guitarist, but had found their drummer. He stayed for two years, eventually resigning in 1978.

Stiff Little Fingers
In 1982 he joined Stiff Little Fingers, playing on the £1.10 or less EP, and the Now Then... (1982) album, before the band split in 1983.

Spear of Destiny
In 1983 after the demise of SLF, Taylor become the occasional session drummer for producer Nick Tauber. Towards the end of 1983 through his work with Nick Tauber, he was introduced to and joined Spear of Destiny as their full-time drummer. Dolphin became a part of The Engine Room, the Spear of Destiny rhythm section, along with bass player Stan Stammers. He left Spear of Destiny in 1986 after they were dropped by their record label CBS, and after the band went through a line-up change.

Marius Müller-Westernhagen
Taylor also was working with a German artist for quite some time in the late 70's and early 80's, singer-songwriter Marius Müller-Westernhagen, appearing on the latter's 1983 album 'Geiler Is' Schon', as an example.

Stiff Little Fingers
In 1987 Taylor was asked to join the reformed SLF, with whom he stayed until 1996, playing on 1991's Flags and Emblems and 1994's Get a Life.

Post-SLF
In 1997 he and one time SLF manager Russell Emanuel set up Extreme Music, a company that composes and sells production music.

See also
 :Category:Songs written by Dolphin Taylor

References

External links
 Extreme Music
 Stiff Little Fingers
 The Engine Room - Spear of Destiny's Rhythm Section

1958 births
Living people
English rock drummers
Stiff Little Fingers members
Spear of Destiny (band) members
Tom Robinson Band members